In mathematics, there are usually many different ways to construct a topological tensor product of two topological vector spaces. For Hilbert spaces or nuclear spaces there is a simple well-behaved theory of tensor products (see Tensor product of Hilbert spaces), but for general Banach spaces or locally convex topological vector spaces the theory is notoriously subtle.

Motivation 
One of the original motivations for topological tensor products  is the fact that tensor products of the spaces of smooth functions on  do not behave as expected. There is an injection

but this is not an isomorphism. For example, the function  cannot be expressed as a finite linear combination of smooth functions in  We only get an isomorphism after constructing the topological tensor product; i.e.,

This article first details the construction in the Banach space case.  is not a Banach space and further cases are discussed at the end.

Tensor products of Hilbert spaces

The algebraic tensor product of two Hilbert spaces A and B has a natural positive definite sesquilinear form (scalar product) induced by the sesquilinear forms of A and B. So in particular it has a natural positive definite quadratic form, and the corresponding completion is a Hilbert space A ⊗ B, called the (Hilbert space) tensor product of A and B.

If the vectors ai and bj run through orthonormal bases of A and B, then the vectors ai⊗bj form an orthonormal basis of A ⊗ B.

Cross norms and tensor products of Banach spaces 

The problem is that there is more than one natural way to define a norm on the tensor product.

There is a cross norm  called the projective cross norm, given by

where 

It turns out that the projective cross norm agrees with the largest cross norm (proposition 2.1).

There is a cross norm  called the injective cross norm, given by

Note hereby that the injective cross norm is only in some reasonable sense the "smallest".

Some authors denote it by  so the Hilbert space tensor product in the section above would be 

A uniform crossnorm  is said to be  if, for every pair  of Banach spaces and every 

A uniform crossnorm  is  if, for every pair  of Banach spaces and every 

A  is defined to be a finitely generated uniform crossnorm. The projective cross norm  and the injective cross norm  defined above are tensor norms and they are called the projective tensor norm and the injective tensor norm, respectively.

Tensor products of locally convex topological vector spaces

There are in general an enormous number of ways to do this. The two most important ways are to take all the projective cross norms, or all the injective cross norms.

This property characterizes nuclear spaces.

See also

References 

.
.

Operator theory
Topological vector spaces
Hilbert space
Topological tensor products
Tensors